Star of the Guardians is a collectible card game based on the Star of the Guardians novel series, and was published by Mag Force 7 in 1995.

Gameplay
Star of the Guardians is a science fiction collectible card game.

Reviews
Pyramid #14
Dragon #218

Further reading
Preview in Scrye #4
Article in Scrye #8

References

External links
 

Card games introduced in 1995
Collectible card games